The Budapest International Championships  also known as the Budapest International was a combined men's and women's clay court tennis tournament founded in 1903. It was first held in Budapest in what was then Austria-Hungary The tournament ran until 1975 then was discontinued.

History
In 1894 the first Championships of Hungary were held. In 1903 the first international tournament the Budapest International were held in then the Austro-Hungarian Empire, the first mens singles title was won by Britain's Major Ritchie. The championships were usually held in late spring to early summer and ran with some breaks due to World War I and World War II until 1975.

References

Clay court tennis tournaments
Defunct tennis tournaments in Hungary